Marit Raaijmakers (born 2 June 1999) is a Dutch racing cyclist, who currently rides for UCI Women's Continental Team .

References

External links
 

1999 births
Living people
Dutch female cyclists
People from Hollands Kroon
Cyclists from North Holland
21st-century Dutch women